Big Star's Little Star is a British game show that began on ITV on 4 September 2013 and is presented by Stephen Mulhern. The show sees three celebrity contestants and their children or grandchildren answering questions about each other to win up to £15,000 for a charity of their choice.

Format

Round 1
The celebrities (known as the 'Big Stars') are asked the same multiple choice questions as their children or grandchildren (known as the 'Little Stars') with the aim being to answer the same. Each of the celebrities is given three questions in turn with the children's or grandchildren's answers pre-recorded and shown on screen.

Round 2
The celebrities watch a series of clips of their children or grandchildren describing several everyday items with the aim being to identify what their children or grandchildren are describing. They are awarded two points if they can identify the items after the first clue and one point after the second clue has been given.

Round 3
The celebrities and their children or grandchildren are given three pictures. They will then be asked a question about either the celebrity or their child/grandchild/children/grandchildren and both of them must answer A, B or C with the objective being that they will answer the same, despite not being able to see each other. At the end of this round, two celebrity pairs leave the programme with £1,000 for their chosen charities, leaving the winning pair to play in the fourth and final round.

Round 4
The winning celebrity and their child/grandchild/children/grandchildren play for £15,000 for charity. As they have already made it through to the final, they automatically win £5,000. In the final round, the two are given 10 pairs of images that mean something to the family that are hidden behind 20 squares on the screen. The images are displayed on the screen for five seconds and then they must work together to match up as many pairs as they can before time runs out. Every pair that they match will earn them an extra £1,000 for their charity. If all 10 are matched, the team win £15,000 for their charity.

Transmissions

Series

Special

Episodes

Series 1

Series 2

Series 3

Special

Series 4

Series 5
A fifth series was confirmed and filming took place during the summer of 2017.

Big Star's Bigger Star

In 2015, the series was reversioned as Big Star's Bigger Star for a Text Santa special with celebrities and their parents. A four-part series, for which filming took place during summer 2017, premiered on 15 December 2018.

Transmissions

Episodes

Special

Series 1

International versions

Awards and nominations
In 2018, Big Star's Little Star made the longlist for the Bruce Forsyth Entertainment Award at the  2019 National Television Awards. However, the programme did not end up making the shortlist.

Footnotes

References

External links

2010s British comedy television series
2013 British television series debuts
2018 British television series endings
2010s British game shows
English-language television shows
ITV game shows
Television series about children
Television series by ITV Studios
ITV comedy